A referendum on introducing balanced budgets was held in Guam on 1 November 1986. Although more voters voted "yes" than "no", the Santos Amendment had required that the referendum required at least 50% of all votes in favour to pass. As a result, the proposal was rejected.

References

1986 referendums
1986 in Guam
Referendums in Guam
Tax reform referendums